Giorgia Gabriele is an Italian model and influencer. She is known for her appearances alongside Gianluca Vacchi, her ex-partner, in their TikTok videos. She founded fashion label Wandering and is the brand's creative director.

References 

Year of birth missing (living people)
Living people
Italian female models